This list of Maya sites is an alphabetical listing of a number of significant archaeological sites associated with the Maya civilization of pre-Columbian Mesoamerica.

The peoples and cultures which comprised the Maya civilization spanned more than 2,500 years of Mesoamerican history, in the Maya Region of southern Mesoamerica, which incorporates the present-day nations of Guatemala and Belize, much of Honduras and El Salvador, and the southeastern states of Mexico from the Isthmus of Tehuantepec eastwards, including the entire Yucatán Peninsula.

Throughout this region, many hundreds of Maya sites have been documented in at least some form by archaeological surveys and investigations, while the numbers of smaller/uninvestigated (or unknown) sites are so numerous (one study has documented over 4,400 Maya sites) that no complete archaeological list has yet been made. The listing which appears here is necessarily incomplete, however it contains notable sites drawn from several large and ongoing surveys, such as the Corpus of Maya Hieroglyphic Inscriptions (CMHI) and other sources (see References).

Note : Ignore the Spanish definite article "El" or "La" (and their plurals "Los" and "Las") when looking for a site in the alphabetical listing e.g. for El Mirador, look under M rather than E.


Most important sites
Maya sites which are known to have been among the largest and most influential polities through the various eras of Maya history —Formative (or Preclassic), Classic and Postclassic—  and/or which have left the most impressive archaeological remains include:

Alphabetical listing

A

B

C

D

E

F

G

H

I

J

K

L

M

N

O

P

Q

R

S

T

U

W

X

Y

Z

See also
Maya architecture
List of Mesoamerican pyramids
Degradation of Mayan archeological sites

Notes

External links

The long-term research project Text Database Dictionary of Classic Mayan is working on a list of Archaeological Sites with Maya Inscriptions that is constantly growing. The list is sorted by site name, and primarily encompasses the archaeological sites in Mesoamerica where Maya hieroglyphic inscriptions have been discovered and verifiably documented over the course of archaeological survey and excavations.

References

 
 Amaroli, Paul; and Fabio E. Amador (2003) "Los Límites de Cihuatán: Reconocimiento arqueológico para determinar la extensión de la antigua ciudad". San Salvador, El Salvador: Fundación Nacional de Arqueología de El Salvador. Retrieved on 11 April 2016.
 
 
 
 
 
 
 
 
 
 
 
 
 
 
 
 
 
 
 
 
 
 
 
 
 
 
 
 
 
 
 
  

Americas-related lists
Archaeology-related lists
Belize-related lists
Guatemala-related lists
Lists of buildings and structures in Mexico